Alec John Distaso (December 23, 1948 – July 13, 2009) was an American professional baseball player, a right-handed pitcher who appeared in two games played for Chicago Cubs of Major League Baseball in .

Distaso's professional career, curtailed by elbow miseries, lasted four seasons (1967–1970), all in the Cubs' organization. After winning 13 games for the Class A Quincy Cubs in 1968, he was included on Chicago's 1969 opening season roster and appeared in two games as a relief pitcher in April. In the first, he hurled two scoreless innings against the expansion edition of the Montreal Expos. In the second, he allowed two earned runs in  innings against the Pittsburgh Pirates, a double by the Pirates' Bob Robertson the most damaging blow.  

He then was sent back to the minor leagues. Some weeks afterward, he hurt his elbow. Distaso tried to pitch through the injury but enjoyed only sporadic success, never enough to warrant a return to the majors. He quit baseball in the spring of 1971.

After retiring as an active player, Distaso became a police officer and then a detective for the Los Angeles Police Department, retiring in 1994. In 1996, he became a public housing administrator in Macomb, Illinois. Distaso died of cancer in 2009.

References

External links

1948 births
2009 deaths
Baseball players from Los Angeles
Caldwell Cubs players
Chicago Cubs players
Lodi Crushers players
Major League Baseball pitchers
Quincy Cubs players
San Antonio Missions players
Tacoma Cubs players